Róbert Varga may refer to:

 Róbert Varga (footballer) (born 1986), Hungarian footballer
 Róbert Varga (tennis) (born 1988), Hungarian tennis player
 Robert Varga (cyclist) (born 1941), French cyclist
 Róbert Varga (ice hockey)